The Supermarine Seafang was a British Rolls-Royce Griffon–engined fighter aircraft designed by Supermarine to Air Ministry specification N.5/45. It was based on the Spiteful, which was a development of Supermarine's famous Spitfire aircraft. By that time the Spitfire was a 10-year-old design in a period of rapid technical development in aviation. The Seafang was outmoded by jet aircraft, and only 18 were built.

Design and development
The Seafang was essentially a Spiteful redesigned for Royal Navy carrier use, with the addition of an arrester hook, a contra-rotating propeller to eliminate engine torque effects, and power folding outer wing panels.

Two prototype Type 396 Seafang Mark 32s were ordered on 12 March 1945 followed by an order for 150 Type 382 Seafang Mark 31s on 7 May 1945. To expedite entry into service the interim Mark 31 was ordered which was a navalised Spiteful, basically a Spiteful with an arrestor hook. This would allow the Mark 32 to be developed; it would be the definitive naval variant, again with an arrestor hook but also folding outer wing panels and a contra-rotating propeller.

The first Seafang flew in 1946; it was the first interim production Mark 31 VG471. Although 150 of the interim variant were ordered, only nine were completed before the order was cancelled as the urgency of an interim type was removed due to the end of the war.

The first prototype definitive Mark 32 VB895 was first flown in June 1946. It was powered by a Griffon 89 engine rated at 2,350 hp (1,752 kW) driving two three-bladed contra-rotating propellers. In August 1946, VB895 was demonstrated to the Royal Netherlands Navy at Valkenburg. Compared to the Seafire F.47, its performance advantage was not deemed to be enough to disrupt series production of new navalised Meteor and Vampire jet fighters. Also, the Seafang's low-speed handling characteristics were not as good as hoped, and the contemporary Hawker Sea Fury was preferred as a fleet fighter.

Seafang Mark 31 VG474 was used as a development aircraft for the Supermarine Attacker including the fitment of power-operated ailerons and contra-rotating propellers. The Attacker was a jet-powered development of the Spiteful/Seafang design which used the Spiteful laminar-flow wing and landing gear.

Supermarine Type 391
In 1943, as the design of the Spiteful was developing, Supermarine presented a brochure to the Air Ministry describing a "High-Performance Aeroplane for the Royal Navy", also known as the Supermarine Type 391. This design was intended to be used as a carrier-borne fighter, with a secondary role as a strike aircraft, able to carry an 18-inch (45.7 cm) Mark XV aerial torpedo. Bombs or rockets could also be carried and the fixed armament was four Hispano Mk. V 20mm cannon. The 391 used the Spiteful/Seafang wing and undercarriage mated to a wide centre-section incorporating leading edge air intakes feeding the coolant radiators for a 3,550 hp, 24 cylinder 46-H-24 (later known as the "Eagle"); this engine drove contra-rotating, four-bladed propellers. The fuselage was longer with a redesigned fin and rudder unit.

Specifications for the Type 391 include a wingspan of 43 ft 6 in (13.3 m), a fuselage length of 39 ft 9 in (12.1 m) and a wing area of 335 ft² (31.2 m²). Maximum weights were 15,750 lb (7,144 kg) as a fighter and 17,250 lb (7,825 kg) when armed with a torpedo. The maximum speed was projected to be 546 mph (879 km/h) at 25,000 ft (7,620 m).

Variants
Type 382 Seafang F.31
Interim production variant with a 2,375 hp Griffon 61 engine, five-bladed constant-speed Rotol airscrew. 150 ordered but only 9 built; the rest were cancelled.
Type 396 Seafang F.32
Two prototypes built powered by a 2,350 hp (1,752 kW) Griffon 89 piston engine, folding wings, increased fuel capacity, dual contra-rotating 3-bladed propellers.

Operators
 
 Fleet Air Arm

Specifications (Seafang 32)

References

Notes

Bibliography
 Bingham, Victor. Supermarine Fighter Aircraft.  Marlborough, UK: The Crowood Press, 2004. .
 Buttler, Tony. British Secret Projects: Fighters and Bombers 1935–1950. Hersham, Surrey, UK: Midland, 2004. .
 Humphreys, Robert. The Supermarine Spitfire, Part 2: Griffon-Powered (Modellers Datafile 5). Bedford, UK: SAM Publications, 2001. .
 Morgan, Eric B. and Edward Shacklady. Spitfire: The History. London: Key Publishing, 1992. .
 Price, Alfred. The Spitfire Story. London: Silverdale Books, 1995. .
 Price, Alfred. "A Spitfire too far: the Supermarine Spiteful". Aeroplane Monthly, July 2001, pp. 36–41.
 Robertson, Bruce. Spitfire: The Story of a Famous Fighter. Hemel Hempstead, Hertfordshire, UK: Model & Allied Publications Ltd., 1960. Third revised edition 1973. .
 Sturtivant, Ray. Fleet Air Arm Fixed-Wing Aircraft since 1946. Tonbridge, Kent, UK: Air Britain (Historians) Ltd., 2004. .

1940s British fighter aircraft
Seafang
Aircraft with contra-rotating propellers
Carrier-based aircraft
Aircraft first flown in 1946
Single-engined tractor aircraft